The Ethnic National Development Party (abbreviated ENDP) is a registered political party in Myanmar. It won a single seat in the 2010 general election, after its candidate Pu Van Cing narrowly defeated his opponent from the Chin Progressive Party (CPP). The party did not win any seats in the 2015 general election.

References

External links 
 

Political parties in Myanmar
Political parties established in 2010
2010 establishments in Myanmar